Wesley Saunders (born 23 February 1963) is an English former professional football player and manager, who played as a central defender. He played for Newcastle United, Bradford City, Carlisle United and Torquay United in the Football League and Dundee in the Scottish Football League. He later managed Torquay United from 1998 to 2001.

Playing career
Saunders was born in Sunderland and brought up in East Boldon, attending Boldon Comprehensive School. He began his career as a junior with Newcastle United, turning professional in June 1981.

Increasingly out of the first team picture at Newcastle, Saunders joined Bradford City on loan in March 1985, moving to Carlisle United for a fee of £20,000 in August 1985.

Saunders subsequently joined Dundee before joining Torquay United in July 1990 for a then club record fee of £60,000. He captained the Torquay side to promotion the following season, Torquay beating Blackpool on penalties in the play-off final at Wembley. The following season he had a lengthy spell as caretaker manager of the team following the sacking of John Impey, and reverted to his playing role upon the appointment of Ivan Golac as manager. His professional playing career was ended by a knee ligament injury just a couple years later.

On leaving Torquay he played non-league football for Spennymoor United and went on to play for and coach a number of non-league sides in the north east of England while working in his family's textile firm.

Management career
In summer 1998, Saunders became manager of Torquay United, this time on a permanent basis, after the departure of Kevin Hodges. He struggled to maintain the progress made by Hodges and in the 2000–01 season, Torquay struggled to the extent that former player Colin Lee was brought in as a consultant. Saunders was dismissed by Torquay on 28 March 2001 after a 1–0 defeat to Carlisle United the previous week had left the club at the bottom of the league and facing relegation to the Football Conference.

He subsequently became a player agent and his players included former England international Paul Gascoigne.

References

1963 births
Living people
People from The Boldons
Footballers from Tyne and Wear
Footballers from Sunderland
English footballers
Newcastle United F.C. players
Bradford City A.F.C. players
Carlisle United F.C. players
Dundee F.C. players
Torquay United F.C. players
English football managers
Torquay United F.C. managers
English Football League players
Spennymoor United F.C. players
Association football central defenders
Scottish Football League players